The Airmail Mystery is a 1932 Universal Pre-Code movie serial directed by Ray Taylor, written by Ella O'Neill, starring James Flavin and Wheeler Oakman, and featuring (Al Wilson) doing the aerial stunts. The Airmail Mystery was Universal's first aviation serial that set the pattern for the aviation serials and feature films to follow. The film also marks the film debut of James Flavin. The Airmail Mystery is considered a lost film.

Plot
Airmail pilot Bob Lee (James Flavin), owner of a gold mine, faces off against "The Black Hawk" (Wheeler Oakman) who has kidnapped Jimmy Ross (Al Wilson), Bob's best friend. The Black Hawk carries out a series of attacks on Bob's ore shipments by air, using an unusual catapult device that launches aircraft into the sky to intercept Bob's aircraft. With his sweetheart, Mary Ross (Lucile Browne), Bob constantly battles against his enemy, and eventually is able to defeat him.

Chapter titles

 Pirates of the Air
 Hovering Death
 A Leap for Life
 A Fatal Crash
 The Hawk Strikes
 The Bridge of Destruction
 The Hawk's Treachery
 The Aerial Third Degree
 The Attack on the Mine
 The Hawk's Lair
 The Law Strikes
 The Mail Must Go Through
Source:

Cast

 James Flavin as Bob Lee
 Lucile Browne as Mary Ross
 Wheeler Oakman as Judson Ward ("The Black Hawk")
 Frank Hagney as Moran
 Sidney Bracey as Driscoll
 Nelson McDowell as "Silent" Simms
 Walter Brennan as Holly
 Al Wilson as Jimmy Ross
 Bruce Mitchell as Capt. Grant
 Jack Holley as Andy

Production
Al Wilson (who played the hero's sidekick Jimmy Ross in the serial) worked together with stuntmen like Frank Clarke and Wally Timm and also for movie companies, including Universal Pictures. After numerous appearances in stunt roles, he started his actor career in 1923, with the serial, The Eagle's Talons. He produced his own movies until 1927, when he went back to work with Universal. Wilson was also one of the pilots in Hell's Angels (1930) and during filming, he was involved in an accident where the mechanic Phil Jones died. This episode marked the end of his career as stunt pilot in movies, although he continued to work as an actor.

Wilson's last role was in The Airmail Mystery. After production was complete, during the National Air Races in Cleveland in 1932, Wilson's aircraft crashed and he died a few days later in hospital due to the injuries he suffered.

See also
 List of American films of 1932
 List of film serials by year
 List of film serials by studio

References

Notes

Citations

Bibliography

 Cline, William C. "3. The Six Faces of Adventure";"Filmography". In the Nick of Time. Jefferson, North Carolina: McFarland & Company, Inc., 1984. .
 Farmer, James H. Celluloid Wings: The Impact of Movies on Aviation (1st ed.). Blue Ridge Summit, Pennsylvania: TAB Books 1984. .
 Harmon, Jim and Donald F. Glut. The Great Movie Serials: Their Sound and Fury. London: Routledge, 1973. .
 Weiss, Ken and Ed Goodgold. To be Continued ...: A Complete Guide to Motion Picture Serials. New York: Bonanza Books, 1973. .
 Wynne, H. Hugh. The Motion Picture Stunt Pilots and Hollywood's Classic Aviation Movies. Missoula, Montana: Pictorial Histories Publishing Co., 1987. .

External links
 

1932 films
1932 adventure films
1930s mystery films
Universal Pictures film serials
American aviation films
American mystery films
American black-and-white films
1930s English-language films
Films directed by Ray Taylor
American adventure films
Lost adventure films
Lost American films
1932 lost films
Films with screenplays by George H. Plympton
1930s American films